Thomas Ellys (1685–1709), of Mitre Court, Inner Temple, was a Member of Parliament for Wendover in 1708 – 24 May 1709.

References

1685 births
1709 deaths
Members of the Inner Temple
British MPs 1708–1710
Members of the Parliament of Great Britain for English constituencies